Francisco Santiago Reyes Villalba, commonly known as Francisco Reyes (July 4, 1941 – July 31, 1976), was a Paraguayan football midfielder and central defender, who played in several top level clubs and in the Paraguay national football team.

Career
Born in Asunción, he started his career playing for Olimpia, winning the Primera División Paraguaya in 1962 and in 1965.
Reyes joined Brazilian club Flamengo in 1967, helped the club to win the Campeonato Carioca in 1972, and left at the end of 1973. He retired while defending Olimpia, winning the Paraguayan League in his last season, in 1975.

National team
He played 13 games for the Paraguay national team between 1961 and 1966

Honors

Club
Olimpia
 Primera División Paraguaya: 1965, 1975

Flamengo
 Campeonato Carioca: 1972

Flamengo
 Best player of tournament by points (Bola de Ouro)

References

1941 births
1976 deaths
Paraguayan footballers
Paraguay international footballers
Club Olimpia footballers
CR Flamengo footballers
Paraguayan expatriate footballers
Expatriate footballers in Brazil
Sportspeople from Asunción
Club Presidente Hayes footballers
Association football defenders
Association football midfielders